Events from the year 1313 in the Kingdom of Scotland.

Incumbents
Monarch – Robert I

Events
 13 January – Robert the Bruce expels English troops from Perth
 7 February – Robert the Bruce captures Dumfries
 18 May – Robert the Bruce invades Isle of Man, capturing it in five days
unknown date –
 Siege of Roxburgh Castle

See also

 Timeline of Scottish history

References

 
Years of the 14th century in Scotland
Wars of Scottish Independence